Power Yoga is any of several forms of energetic vinyasa-style yoga as exercise developed in America in the 1990s. These include forms derived from Ashtanga Vinyasa Yoga, namely those of Beryl Bender Birch, Bryan Kest, and Larry Schultz, and forms derived from Bikram Yoga, such as that of Baron Baptiste.

History
Power Yoga began in the 1990s with "nearly simultaneous invention" by two students of K. Pattabhi Jois, and similar forms led by other yoga teachers including Larry Schultz's Rocket Yoga.

Beryl Bender Birch created what Yoga Journal calls "the original Power Yoga" in 1995. 

Bryan Kest, who studied Ashtanga Vinyasa Yoga under K. Pattabhi Jois, and Baron Baptiste, a Bikram enthusiast, separately put their own spins on the style, and branded it. Neither Baron Baptiste's Power Yoga nor Bryan Kest's Power Yoga are synonymous with Ashtanga Yoga. In 1995, Jois wrote a letter to Yoga Journal expressing his disappointment at the association between his Ashtanga Yoga, and the newly coined style "power yoga", referring to it as "ignorant bodybuilding".

References

External links

There are several separate institutes which each teach their own forms of 'Power Yoga'.

 The Hard & The Soft Yoga Institute (Beryl Bender Birch)
 Power Yoga (Bryan Kest)
 Baptiste Institute (Baron Baptiste)
 25 Amazing Benefits of Yoga

Yoga styles